CupNoodles Museum may refer to one of two museums in Japan:

 CupNoodles Museum Osaka Ikeda
 CupNoodles Museum Yokohama